Colin Leo Piquette (born 1969 or 1970) is a Canadian politician who was elected in the 2015 Alberta general election to the Legislative Assembly of Alberta representing the electoral district of Athabasca-Sturgeon-Redwater. He is the son of former NDP MLA Leo Piquette.

Electoral history

2015 general election

References

Alberta New Democratic Party MLAs
Living people
1970s births
Franco-Albertan people
21st-century Canadian politicians